= Dr. William Snowden House =

American historical landmark

Coordinates: 32.771364°N 79.929588°W

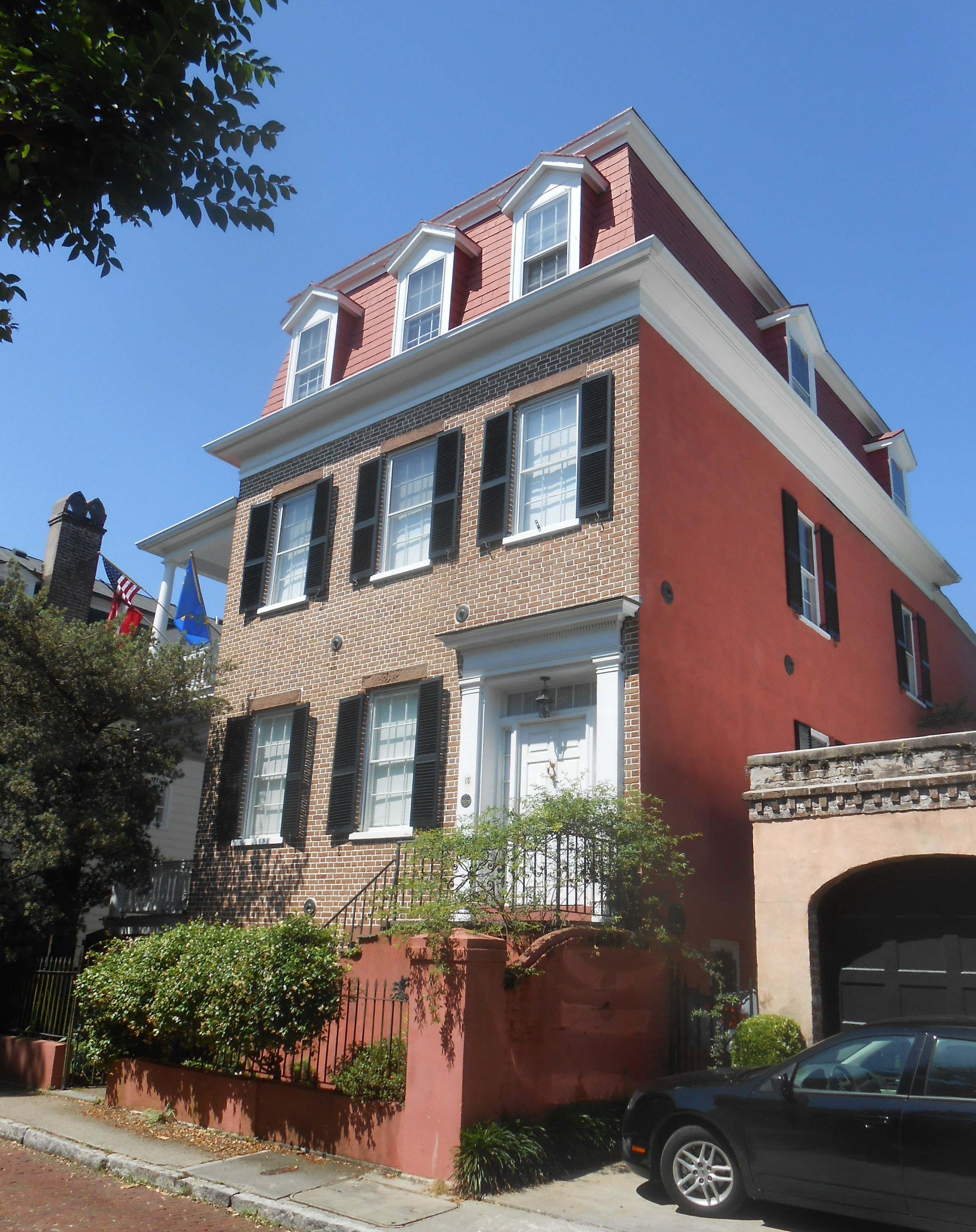
The Dr. William Snowden House is at 15 Church Street, Charleston, South Carolina.

The Dr. William Snowden House was used as a hospital operated by its owner, Dr. William Snowden, and Dr. Snowden's wife, Amarynthia Yates Snowden. When bombardment of the city forced the Snowdens to evacuate to Columbia, South Carolina, the family's silver was buried in the yard; it was not unearthed until the 1920s when a box of the silver was found during landscaping work. After the Civil War, meetings were held in the house that led to the formation of the Confederate Home and College. The house was itself mortgaged to fund the creation of the institution, which existed to care for wives and daughters of Confederate soldiers.
